Washington Square was an entertainment area in Bangkok, Thailand, located for many years at Sukhumvit Soi 22, near the Phrom Phong skytrain station. It contained bars, restaurants, massage parlors and a katoey theatre. Popular mainly with Bangkok expatriates, Middle East oil field workers and older, male, white Americans including many Vietnam War veterans, Bourbon Street was well known for serving Cajun and Creole food and was written up by the Bangkok Post in 2005.  

The area features in Christopher G. Moore's series of crime novels about private eye Vincent Calvino, and the Texas Lone Staar bar was often mentioned in the mystery novels of Dean Barrett, who once rented an apartment in the Square.

Washington Square was completely demolished in 2013, pending the construction of a shopping mall and several high rise buildings. The restaurants and a few of the bars have relocated elsewhere on Sukhumit Road, but most have simply closed. The Emporium group's plan to build a shopping mall called EmSphere was put on hold. A dinosaur theme park was established on the site in 2016. The theme park closed in April 2018.

References

 
Neighbourhoods of Bangkok	
Red-light districts in Thailand